Euphorbia doloensis is a species of plant in the family Euphorbiaceae. It is endemic to Ethiopia.

References

doloensis
Flora of Ethiopia
Vulnerable plants
Endemic flora of Ethiopia
Taxonomy articles created by Polbot